Manuel is a male given name originating in the Hebrew name Immanu'el (which means "God with us."   It was possibly brought from the Byzantine Empire (as ) to Spain and Portugal, where it has been used since at least the 13th century. Manuel is popular in Spanish, Portuguese, German, French, Romanian, Greek (Latinized), Polish and Dutch where Manny or Manu is used as a nickname.

Middle Ages

 Manuel I Komnenos (1118–1180)
 Manuel II Palaiologos (1350–1425)
 Manuel I of Trebizond (1218–1263)
 Manuel II of Trebizond (1324–1333)
 Manuel III of Trebizond (1364–1417)
 Manuel I of Portugal (1469–1521)
 Infante Manuel, Count of Ourém, Portuguese prince, son of Peter II of Portugal
  Manuel of Castile (1234–1283), son of Ferdinand III of Castile
 Manuel I, patriarch of Constantinople in 1216–22
 Manuel II, patriarch of Constantinople in 1244–55
 Manuel Christonymos, birth name of Patriarch Maximus III of Constantinople, reigned 1476–1482

Early modern
 Manuel da Nóbrega (1517–1570), Portuguese Jesuit and missionary in the early Colonial Brazil
 Manuel, Prince of Portugal (1531–1537), son of John III of Portugal
 Manuel Maria Barbosa du Bocage (1765–1805), Portuguese poet
 Manuel Cardoso (composer) (1566–1650), Portuguese composer
 Manuel Belgrano (1770–1820), Argentine politician and military leader during the Argentine War of Independence
 Manuel Pardo (politician) (1834-1878), Peruvian politician
 Manuel Pinto da Fonseca (1681–1773), Portuguese nobleman and Grand Master of the Order of Malta

Modern given name

 Patriarchs of Lisbon
 Manuel II, 14th. cardinal-patriarch of Lisbon (1929–71)
 Manuel III, 17th. cardinal-patriarch of Lisbon (since 2013)
 Manuel II of Portugal (1889–1932), the last King of Portugal (1908–1910)
 Manuel Agogo (born 1979), Ghanaian football player
 Manuel Alegre (born 1936), Portuguese poet and politician
 Manny Aparicio (born 1995), Canadian football player
 Manuel Alfonso Andrade Oropeza (born 1989), Mexican professional wrestler known as "Andrade"
 Manuel de Blas (born 1941), Spanish actor
 Manuel Bandeira (1886–1968), Brazilian writer
 Manuel Bihr (born 1993), Thai footballer
 Manuel Caballero (1931–2010), Venezuelan historian
 Manuel Cortés Quero (1906-1991), Spanish politician
 Manuel Cuevas (born 1933), Mexican fashion designer
 Manuel Dubrulle (born 1972), French badminton player
 Manuel Elizalde Sr., Filipino businessman, polo player and sports patron
 Manuel Elizalde Jr. (1936–1997), Filipino businessman
 Manuel Ferrara (born 1975), French pornographic actor and director
 Manuel Fettner (born 1985), Austrian ski jumper
 Manuel Gava (born 1991), Italian-born German politician
 Manuel Teixeira Gomes (1860–1941), Portuguese politician and writer, 7th President of Portugal
 Manuel Göttsching (born 1952), German musician, member of Ash Ra Tempel
 Manuel Hassassian (born 1953), Armenian-Palestinian professor
 Manuel Lanzini (born 1993), Argentinian footballer
 Manuel Locatelli (born 1998), Italian footballer
 Manuel Machata (born 1984), German bobsledder and World Champion of 2011
 Manuel Mamikonian (fl. 4th century), Armenian general and ruler
 Manuel Merino (born 1961), Peruvian politician and current president of Peru
 Manuel Morales (basketball) (born 1987), Peruvian basketball player
 Manuel Moroun (1927–2020), American businessman
 Manuel Neuer (born 1986), German football goalkeeper
 Manuel Noriega (1934–2017), Panamanian dictator and criminal
 Manoel de Oliveira (1908–2015), Portuguese film director
 Manuel V. Pangilinan (born 1946), Filipino businessman
 Manuel "Manny" Pardo (1956-2012), American serial killer and former police officer
 Manuel Pardo (governor) (1774–??), Spanish soldier and governor 
 Manuel Pellegrini (born 1953), Chilean football manager
 Manuel Pinho (born 1954), Portuguese politician and economist
 Manuel Poppinger (born 1989), Austrian ski jumper
 Manuel L. Quezon (1878–1944), first President of the Commonwealth of the Philippines
 Manny Ramírez (born 1972), Dominican-American Major League Baseball player
 Manuel Rivera-Ortiz (born 1968), American photographer
 Manuel Rocha (born 1950), American diplomat
 Manuel Roxas (1892–1948), first President of the Third Philippine Republic
 Manuel "Mar" Roxas II (born 1957), Filipino politician, grandson of Manuel Roxas
 Manuel Sanhouse (born 1975), Venezuelan football goalkeeper
 Manuel Seco (born 1928), Spanish lexicographer
 Manuel Sosa (judge) (born 1950), Belizean jurist
 Manuel Tenenbaum (1934–2016), Uruguayan educator, historian and philanthropist
 Manuel Uribe (1965–2014), Mexican who was at one time considered to be the heaviest man in the world
 Manuel & the Music of the Mountains, pseudonym of composer/arranger Geoff Love (1917–1991)

Surname 

 Charlie Manuel (born 1944), American baseball player, coach and manager
 EJ Manuel (born 1990), American football player
 Herman E. Manuel (1849–1918), American politician
 Jacques-Antoine Manuel (1775–1827), French politician
 Jerry Manuel (born 1953), American baseball manager
 Juan Manuel, Prince of Villena (1232–1328), Spanish noble and medieval writer, son of Infante Manuel of Castile
 Laurent Manuel (born 1986), American association football (soccer) player
 Louis Pierre Manuel (1751–1793), political figure of the French Revolution
 Niklaus Manuel (c.1484–1530), Swiss painter
 Peter Manuel (1927–1958), American-born Scottish serial killer
 Richard Manuel (1943–1986), Canadian composer, singer and multi-instrumentalist with The Band
 Rob Manuel (born 1973), English developer/producer of humorous/miscellaneous web content
 Rod Manuel (born 1974), American football player

 Simone Manuel (born 1996), American swimmer
 Vic Manuel (born 1987), Filipino basketball player

Fictional characters
 Manuel (Fawlty Towers), waiter in the BBC TV sitcom
 Manny Calavera, protagonist of the adventure game Grim Fandango
 Manny Pardo, a hard-boiled detective in the game Hotline Miami 2: Wrong Number (based on serial killer Manny Pardo)

See also
 Isaiah 7:14
 List of names referring to El

References

Portuguese masculine given names
Spanish masculine given names
Hebrew-language names
Romanian masculine given names
English masculine given names
French masculine given names
Italian masculine given names
German masculine given names
Dutch masculine given names
Polish masculine given names
Theophoric names